Charonia is a genus of very large sea snail, commonly known as Triton's trumpet or Triton snail. They are marine gastropod mollusks in the monotypic family Charoniidae.

Etymology
The common name "Triton's trumpet" is derived from the Greek god Triton, who was the son of Poseidon, god of the sea. The god Triton is often portrayed blowing a large seashell horn similar to this species.

Fossil records
This genus is known in the fossil records as far back as the Cretaceous period. Fossils are found in the marine strata throughout the world.

Description
Species within the genus Charonia have large fusiform shells, usually whiteish with brown or yellow markings.

The shell of the giant triton Charonia tritonis (Linnaeus, 1758), which lives in the Indo-Pacific, can grow to over half a metre (20 inches) in length.

One slightly smaller (shell size  but still very large species, Charonia variegata (Lamarck, 1816), lives in the western Atlantic, from North Carolina to Brazil.

Distribution
Charonia species inhabit temperate and tropical waters worldwide.

Life habits
Unlike pulmonate and opisthobranch gastropods, tritons are not hermaphrodites; they have separate sexes and undergo sexual reproduction with internal fertilization.  The female deposits white capsules in clusters, each of which contains many developing larvae.  The larvae emerge free-swimming and enter the plankton, where they drift in open water for up to three months.

Feeding behavior
Adult tritons are active predators and feed on other molluscs and starfish. The giant triton has gained fame for its ability to capture and eat crown-of-thorns starfish, a large species (up to 1 m in diameter) covered in venomous spikes an inch long. The crown-of-thorns starfish has few other natural predators, and are capable of destroying large sections of coral reef.

Tritons can be observed to turn and give chase when the scent of prey is detected. Some starfish (including the crown-of-thorns starfish) appear to be able to detect the approach of the mollusc by means which are not clearly understood, and they will attempt flight before any physical contact has taken place. Tritons, however, are faster than starfish, and only large starfish have a reasonable hope of escape, and then only by abandoning whichever limb the snail seizes first.

The triton grips its prey with its muscular foot and uses its toothy radula (a serrated, scraping organ found in gastropods) to saw through the starfish's armoured skin. Once it has penetrated, a paralyzing saliva subdues the prey and the snail feeds at leisure, often beginning with the softest parts such as the gonads and gut.

Tritons ingest smaller prey animals whole without troubling to paralyse them, and will spit out any poisonous spines, shells, or other unwanted parts later.

Species and subspecies 

Species within the genus Charonia include:
 Charonia guichemerrei Lozouet, 1998 †
 Charonia lampas (Linnaeus, 1758)
 Charonia marylenae Petuch & Berschauer, 2020
 Charonia seguenzae (Aradas & Benoit, 1872)
 Charonia tritonis (Linnaeus, 1758)
 Charonia variegata (Lamarck, 1816) - Caribbean Triton's trumpet
 Charonia veterior  Lozouet, 1999 †

Synonymized species
 Charonia capax Finlay, 1926: synonym of Charonia lampas (Linnaeus, 1758)
 Charonia digitalis (Reeve, 1844): synonym of Maculotriton serriale (Deshayes, 1834)
 Charonia eucla Hedley, 1914 : synonym of Charonia lampas (Linnaeus, 1758)
 Charonia eucla instructa Iredale, 1929: synonym of Charonia lampas (Linnaeus, 1758)
 Charonia grandimaculatus Reeve: synonym of Lotoria grandimaculata (Reeve, 1844)
 Charonia maculosum Gmelin: synonym of Colubraria maculosa (Gmelin, 1791) (new combination)
 Charonia mirabilis Parenzan, 1970: synonym of Charonia lampas (Linnaeus, 1758)
 Charonia nodifera(Lamarck, 1822): synonym of Charonia lampas (Linnaeus, 1758)
 Charonia poecilostoma Smith, 1915: synonym of Ranella gemmifera (Euthyme, 1889)
 Charonia powelli Cotton, 1957 : synonym of Charonia lampas (Linnaeus, 1758)
 Charonia rubicunda (Perry, 1811): synonym of Charonia lampas (Linnaeus, 1758)
 Charonia sauliae (Reeve, 1844): synonym of Charonia lampas (Linnaeus, 1758)
 Charonia seguenzae''(Aradas & Benoit, 1872)  synonym of Charonia variegata (Lamarck, 1816)
 Charonia variegatus Reeve: synonym of Charonia variegata (Lamarck, 1816)

References

 Beu A.G. 1998. Indo-West Pacific Ranellidae, Bursidae and Personidae (Mollusca: Gastropoda). A monograph of the New Caledonian fauna and revisions of related taxa''. Mémoires du Muséum national d'Histoire naturelle 178: 1-255

External links
 An article on the crown-of-thorns starfish which contains excellent pictures of one being eaten by a triton.

Charoniidae
Gastropod genera
Cenomanian genus first appearances
Extant Late Cretaceous first appearances
Taxa named by Johannes von Nepomuk Franz Xaver Gistel